Pasjača is a village in the municipality of Prokuplje, Serbia.

Population
According to the 2002 census, the village has a population of 35 people.

References

Populated places in Toplica District